This is a list of 172 species in Canthidium, a genus of dung beetles in the family Scarabaeidae.

Canthidium species

 Canthidium abbreviatum Harold, 1867 c g
 Canthidium aeneolum Harold, 1867 c g
 Canthidium alvarezi Martinez & Halffter, 1986 c g
 Canthidium andersoni Kohlmann & Solis, 2006 c g
 Canthidium angulicolle Balthasar, 1939 c g
 Canthidium angusticeps Bates, 1887 c g
 Canthidium annagabrielae Solis & Kohlmann, 2004 c g
 Canthidium ardens Bates, 1887 c g
 Canthidium aterrimum Harold, 1867 c g
 Canthidium atomarium Balthasar, 1939 c g
 Canthidium atramentarium Balthasar, 1939 c g
 Canthidium atricolle Preudhomme de Borre, 1886 c g
 Canthidium aurichalceum Preudhomme de Borre, 1886 c g
 Canthidium auricolle Harold, 1867 c g
 Canthidium aurifex Bates, 1887 c g
 Canthidium barbacenicum Preudhomme de Borre, 1886 c g
 Canthidium basale Harold, 1867 c g
 Canthidium basipunctatum Balthasar, 1939 c g
 Canthidium batesi Harold, 1867 c g
 Canthidium bicolor Boucomont, 1928 c g
 Canthidium bituberifrons Howden & Young, 1981 c g
 Canthidium bokermanni (Martinez, Halffter & Pereira, 1964) c g
 Canthidium bovinum Harold, 1867 c g
 Canthidium breve (Germar, 1824) c g
 Canthidium caesareum Balthasar, 1939 c g
 Canthidium calidum Harold, 1880 c g
 Canthidium cavifrons Balthasar, 1939 c g
 Canthidium centrale (Boucomont, 1928) c g
 Canthidium chabanaudi Boucomont, 1928 c g
 Canthidium chrysis (Fabricius, 1801) c g
 Canthidium clypeale Harold, 1867 c g
 Canthidium coerulescens Balthasar, 1939 c g
 Canthidium cognatum Preudhomme de Borre, 1886 c g
 Canthidium collare (Castelnau, 1840) c g
 Canthidium convexifrons Balthasar, 1939 c g
 Canthidium cupreum (Blanchard, 1846) c g
 Canthidium cuprinum Harold, 1867 c g
 Canthidium darwini Kohlmann & Solis, 2009 c g
 Canthidium decoratum (Perty, 1830) c g
 Canthidium delgadoi Kohlmann & Solis, 2006 c g
 Canthidium deplanatum Balthasar, 1939 c g
 Canthidium depressum Boucomont, 1928 c g
 Canthidium deyrollei Harold, 1867 c g
 Canthidium discolor Harold, 1867 c g
 Canthidium discopygidiale Howden & Young, 1981 c g
 Canthidium dispar Harold, 1867 c g
 Canthidium dohrni Harold, 1867 c g
 Canthidium elegantulum Balthasar, 1939 c g
 Canthidium emoryi Solis & Kohlmann, 2004 c g
 Canthidium epistomale Boucomont, 1928 c g
 Canthidium erythropterum (Lucas, 1857) c g
 Canthidium escalerai Balthasar, 1939 c g
 Canthidium euchalceum Balthasar, 1939 c g
 Canthidium excisipes Balthasar, 1939 c g
 Canthidium femoratum Boucomont, 1935 c g
 Canthidium flabellatum Harold, 1883 c g
 Canthidium flavicorne (Blanchard, 1846) c g
 Canthidium flavipes Harold, 1867 c g
 Canthidium flavum Balthasar, 1939 c g
 Canthidium foveolatum Harold, 1867 c g
 Canthidium funebre Balthasar, 1939 c g
 Canthidium gemmingeri Harold, 1867 c g
 Canthidium gerstaeckeri Harold, 1867 c g
 Canthidium gigas Balthasar, 1939 c g
 Canthidium glabricolle Harold, 1867 c g
 Canthidium globulum Harold, 1867 c g
 Canthidium gracilipes Harold, 1867 c g
 Canthidium granuliferum (Pereira, 1949) c
 Canthidium guanacaste Howden & Gill, 1987 c g
 Canthidium guyanense Boucomont, 1928 c g
 Canthidium haagi Harold, 1867 c g
 Canthidium haroldi Preudhomme de Borre, 1886 c g
 Canthidium hespenheidei Howden & Young, 1981 c g
 Canthidium histrio Balthasar, 1939 c g
 Canthidium howdeni Kohlmann & Solis, 2006 c g
 Canthidium humerale (Germar, 1813) c g
 Canthidium hyla Balthasar, 1939 c g
 Canthidium hypocrita Balthasar, 1939 c g
 Canthidium imperiale Harold, 1876 c g
 Canthidium impressum Boucomont, 1928 c g
 Canthidium inerme Harold, 1867 c g
 Canthidium inoptatum Balthasar, 1939 c g
 Canthidium kelleri (Martinez, Halffter & Pereira, 1964) c g
 Canthidium kiesenwetteri Harold, 1867 c g
 Canthidium kirschi Harold, 1875 c g
 Canthidium korschefskyi Balthasar, 1939 c g
 Canthidium kraatzi Harold, 1867 c g
 Canthidium laetum Harold, 1867 i c g
 Canthidium laevigatum Harold, 1867 c g
 Canthidium latipleurum Preudhomme de Borre, 1886 c g
 Canthidium latum (Blanchard, 1846) c g
 Canthidium lebasi Harold, 1867 c g
 Canthidium lentum Erichson, 1847 c g
 Canthidium leucopterum Howden & Young, 1981 c g
 Canthidium lucidum Harold, 1867 c g
 Canthidium luteum Balthasar, 1939 c g
 Canthidium macclevei Kohlmann & Solis, 2006 i c g b
 Canthidium macroculare Howden & Gill, 1987 c g
 Canthidium magnum Harold, 1871 c g
 Canthidium manni Arrow, 1913 c g
 Canthidium margaritae Kohlmann & Solis, 2006 c g
 Canthidium marianelae Solis & Kohlmann, 2004 c g
 Canthidium marielae Solis & Kohlmann, 2004 c g
 Canthidium marseuli Harold, 1867 c g
 Canthidium melanocephalum (Olivier, 1789) c g
 Canthidium metallicum Harold, 1867 c g
 Canthidium minimum Harold, 1883 c g
 Canthidium miscellum Harold, 1883 c g
 Canthidium moestum Harold, 1867 c g
 Canthidium monoceros Harold, 1869 c g
 Canthidium moroni Kohlmann & Solis, 2006 c g
 Canthidium multipunctatum Balthasar, 1939 c g
 Canthidium muticum (Boheman, 1858) c g
 Canthidium nanum Harold, 1867 c g
 Canthidium nigritum Preudhomme de Borre, 1886 c g
 Canthidium nitidum (Blanchard, 1846) c g
 Canthidium nobile Harold, 1867 c g
 Canthidium obscurum Harold, 1867 c g
 Canthidium onitoides (Perty, 1830) c g
 Canthidium onthophagoides Martinez & Halffter, 1986 c g
 Canthidium opacum Balthasar, 1939 c g
 Canthidium pallidoalatum Howden & Young, 1981 c g
 Canthidium paranum Harold, 1867 c g
 Canthidium parvulum Harold, 1883 c g
 Canthidium perceptibile Howden & Young, 1981 c g
 Canthidium persplendens Balthasar, 1939 c g
 Canthidium picipes Harold, 1867 c g
 Canthidium pinotoides Balthasar, 1939 c g
 Canthidium planovultum Howden & Young, 1981 c g
 Canthidium politum Harold, 1867 c g
 Canthidium prasinum (Blanchard, 1846) c g
 Canthidium priscillae Solis & Kohlmann, 2004 c g
 Canthidium pseudaurifex Balthasar, 1939 c g
 Canthidium pseudoperceptibile Kohlmann & Solis, 2006 c g
 Canthidium pseudopuncticolle Solís and Kohlmann, 2004 i c g
 Canthidium pullus (Felsche, 1910) c g
 Canthidium punctatostriatum (Mannerheim, 1829) c g
 Canthidium puncticeps Harold, 1867 c g
 Canthidium puncticolle Harold, 1867 c g
 Canthidium quadridens Harold, 1867 c g
 Canthidium refulgens Boucomont, 1928 c g
 Canthidium riverai Kohlmann & Solis, 2006 c g
 Canthidium ruficolle (Germar, 1824) c g
 Canthidium rufinum Harold, 1867 c g
 Canthidium rufipes Harold, 1867 c g
 Canthidium rutilum Harold, 1867 c g
 Canthidium seladon Balthasar, 1939 c g
 Canthidium semicupreum Harold, 1868 c g
 Canthidium sladeni Arrow, 1903 c g
 Canthidium smaragdinum Harold, 1867 c g
 Canthidium smithi Bates, 1889 c g
 Canthidium splendidum Preudhomme de Borre, 1886 c g
 Canthidium stali Harold, 1867 c g
 Canthidium steinheili Harold, 1880 c g
 Canthidium subdopuncticolle Howden & Young, 1981 c g
 Canthidium sulcatum (Perty, 1830) c g
 Canthidium sulcicolle Harold, 1868 c g
 Canthidium taurinum Harold, 1867 c g
 Canthidium tenebrosum Howden & Young, 1981 c g
 Canthidium thalassinum Erichson, 1847 c g
 Canthidium titschacki Balthasar, 1939 c g
 Canthidium tricolor Balthasar, 1939 c g
 Canthidium trinodosum (Boheman, 1858) c g
 Canthidium tuberifrons Howden & Young, 1981 c g
 Canthidium variolosum Howden & Young, 1981 c g
 Canthidium versicolor Harold, 1867 c g
 Canthidium vespertinum Howden & Young, 1981 c g
 Canthidium violaceipenne (Blanchard, 1846) c g
 Canthidium viride (Lucas, 1857) c g
 Canthidium viridicolle (Blanchard, 1846) c g
 Canthidium viridiobscurum Boucomont, 1928 c g
 Canthidium volxemi Preudhomme de Borre, 1886 c g

Data sources: i = ITIS, c = Catalogue of Life, g = GBIF, b = Bugguide.net

References

Canthidium